Biospeleology, also known as cave biology, is a branch of biology dedicated to the study of organisms that live in caves and are collectively referred to as troglofauna.

Biospeleology as a science

History
The first documented mention of a cave organisms dates back to 1689, with the documentation of the olm, a cave salamander. Discovered in a cave in Slovenia, in the region of Carniola, it was mistaken for a baby dragon and was recorded by Johann Weikhard von Valvasor in his work The Glory of the Duchy of Carniola. 
The first formal study on cave organisms was conducted on the blind cave beetle. Found in 1831 by Luka Čeč, an assistant to the lamplighter, when exploring the newly discovered inner portions of the Postojna cave system in southwestern Slovenia. The specimen was turned over to Ferdinand J. Schmidt, who described it in the paper Illyrisches Blatt (1832). He named it Leptodirus Hochenwartii after the donor, and also gave it the Slovene name drobnovratnik and the German name Enghalskäfer, both meaning "slender-necked (beetle)". The article represents the first formal description of a cave animal (the olm, described in 1768, wasn't recognized as a cave animal at the time).
Subsequent research by Schmidt revealed further previously unknown cave inhabitants, which aroused considerable interest among natural historians. For this reason, the discovery of L. hochenwartii (along with the olm) is considered as the starting point of biospeleology as a scientific discipline. Biospeleology was formalized as a science in 1907 by Emil Racoviță with his seminal work Essai sur les problèmes biospéologiques ("Essay on biospeleological problems”).

Subdivisions

Organisms Categories
Cave organisms fall into three basic classes:

Troglobite
Troglobites are obligatory cavernicoles, specialized for cave life. Some can leave caves for short periods, and may complete parts of their life cycles above ground, but cannot live their entire lives outside of a cave environment. Examples include chemotrophic bacteria, some species of flatworms, springtails, and cavefish.

Troglophile
Troglophiles can live part or all of their lives in caves, but can also complete a life cycle in appropriate environments on the surface. Examples include cave crickets, bats, millipedes, pseudoscorpions and spiders.

Trogloxene
Trogloxenes frequent caves, and may require caves for a portion of its life cycle, but must return to the surface (or a parahypogean zone) for at least some portion of its life. Oilbirds and most Daddy longlegs are trogloxenes.

Environmental Categories
Cave environments fall into three general categories:

Endogean
Endogean environments are the parts of caves that are in communication with surface soils through cracks and rock seams, groundwater seepage, and root protrusion.

Parahypogean
Parahypogean environments are the threshold regions near cave mouths that extend to the last penetration of sunlight.

Hypogean
Hypogean or "true" cave environments. These can be in regular contact with the surface via wind and underground rivers, or the migration of animals, or can be almost entirely isolated. Deep hypogean environments can host autonomous ecologies whose primary source of energy is not sunlight, but chemical energy liberated from limestone and other minerals by chemoautotrophic bacteria.

Notable biospeleologists
 Emil Racoviță, co-founder of biospeleology
 Carl Eigenmann
 Louis Fage
 René Jeannel, co-founder of biospeleology
 Curt Kosswig

Bibliography
 Bernard Collignon, Caving, scientific approaches., Edisud 1988
 Fabien Steak, Approach biospéologie, File EFS Instruction No. 116, 1st Edition, 1997
 C. Delamare-Debouteville, Life in caves, PUF, Que sais-je?, Paris 1971
 Bernard Gèze, Scientific caving, Seuil, Paris, 1965, p. 137-167
 R. and V. Decou Ginet, Introduction to biology and groundwater ecology, University Publishing Delarge 1977
 René Jeannel, Animal cave in France, Lechevalier, Paris, 1926
 René Jeannel, Living fossils caves, Gallimard, Paris, 1943
 Edward Alfred Martel, Groundwater evolution, Flammarion, Paris, 1908, p. 242-289
 Georges Émile Racovitza, Essay on biospéologiques problems, I Biospeologica 1907
 Michel Siffre, Animals sinkholes and caves, Hachette, 1979
 Michel Siffre, France The caves and caverns, ed. Privat, 1999, p. 136-153
 G. and R. Thines Tercafs, Atlas of the underground life: the cave animals, Boubée (Paris) and De Visscher (Brussels), 1972
 Albert Vandel Biospéologie: the biology of cave animals, Gauthier-Villars, Paris, 1964
 Armand Vire, The subterranean fauna of France, Paris, 1900

References

External links
 Biospeleology; The Biology of Caves, Karst, and Groundwater, by Texas Natural Science Center, the University of Texas at Austin and the Missouri Department of Conservation
 Cave Biota; an evolving "webumentary", sponsored by Hoosier National Forest and Indiana Karst Conservancy

Speleology
Earth sciences